4 Artillery Brigade (pronounced as Four Artillery Brigade)  and colloquially known as "Gunners", is the artillery arm of the Namibian Army based at Otjiwarongo. It functions as the Army's artillery Formation and hosts all the Artillery regiments of the Army.

History
The brigade was formed in 1999. It is the controlling entity of all artillery units in the Army. Shortly after its formation the Brigade received G2 towed artillery from South Africa. The prefix "4" is taken from 4 May 1978, the date on which the SADF attacked a SWAPO refugee camp in Cassinga.

Equipment
The Brigade uses the following equipment:
BL 5.5
Ordnance QF 25 pounder
152 mm howitzer-gun M1937 (ML-20)
BM-21 Grad
Grad-P
Type 81 (rocket launcher)
9P138 Grad-1

Units

12 Artillery Regiment
-Attached to 12 Motorised Infantry Brigade

44 Artillery Regiment 
46 Artillery Regiment
21 Artillery Regiment
-Attached to 21 Motorised Infantry Brigade

26 Artillery Regiment
-Attached to 26 Motorised Infantry Brigade

School of Artillery
-Based at Ondangwa the school trains students to specialize them as gunners through the Artillery Ordnance Operators Course.

Gallery
 Artillery battery firing G-2 Guns and MRLS

Leadership

References

Military of Namibia
Artillery brigades
Military units and formations established in 1999
1999 establishments in Namibia